3–5 The Shambles is an historic trio of buildings in the English city of York, North Yorkshire. Grade II listed, parts of the structures date to the early 19th century.

Its orange-grey bricks are in Flemish bond, while the shopfront and guttering is made of timber.

One of the buildings formerly served as the Shoulder of Mutton public house.

Numbers 1 to 5 were modernised in 1970–71, the result of which created a series of individual businesses, with a single suite above for office space.

As of 2018, the buildings were occupied by Take One Gifts and The Shambles Sweet Shop.

References 

3
Houses in North Yorkshire
19th-century establishments in England
Grade II listed buildings in York
Grade II listed houses
19th century in York